Grill is a census-designated place in Cumru Township, Berks County, Pennsylvania, United States.  It is located just to the east of the borough of Kenhorst at the intersection of PA routes 625 and 724.  The area is generally suburban in nature, and is served by the Governor Mifflin School District.  As of the 2010 census, the population was 1,468 residents.

Demographics

References

Populated places in Berks County, Pennsylvania